Alfred Bloch, also known as Jean Bloch, (born 1877) was a French Olympic football player. He was affiliated with the Racing Club de France, in Paris.

Bloch won a silver medal playing football for France in the 1900 Olympics.  Bloch was Jewish.

See also
List of select Jewish football (association; soccer) players

References

External links

1877 births
French footballers
Olympic footballers of France
Olympic silver medalists for France
Footballers at the 1900 Summer Olympics
Year of death missing
Medalists at the 1900 Summer Olympics
Olympic medalists in football
Jewish footballers
19th-century French Jews
Racing Club de France Football players
Association football midfielders
Date of birth missing
Place of birth missing
Place of death missing